306090 was an independent architecture journal and book series produced from 2002 to 2013 by nonprofit arts stewardship 306090, Inc., and distributed by Princeton Architectural Press. 306090 published nine multi-authored thematic journal volumes, six thematic books, and one special issue that served as the official catalog for the United States Pavilion at the 2010 Venice Biennale of Architecture.

Contributors to each of the thematic issues ranged in experience, from students to professionals distinguished in their fields. The series brought together diverse writings and projects to explore “contemporary issues in architecture from every angle,” many issues containing work spanning the arts and sciences. Contributors include: Jesse Reiser, Kengo Kuma, Lisa Sigal, James Buckhouse, Heather Roberge, Lori Brown, Hal Foster, Rafael Cardenas, Beatriz Colomina, Galia Solomonoff, Cecil Balmond, Gregg Pasquarelli, Hilary Sample, Craig Dworkin, Kent Bloomer, Els Verbakel, James Wines, Alessandra Ponte, and Olafur Eliasson. 306090 books were designed by David Reinfurt of O-R-G, and, from 2007 to 2013 by Luke Bulman of Thumb.

As an organization, 306090 curated and organized lectures, round-table discussions, and exhibits at venues including The Architectural League of New York and Storefront for Art and Architecture. In 2010, 306090 was co-commissioner, with the High Museum of Art, of the American Pavilion at the Venice Biennale of Architecture.

306090 journal issues
 306090 01, Where Are We Right Now  
 306090 02, Student Discount  
 306090 03, Urban Education  
 306090 04, Global Trajectories  
 306090 05, Teaching and Building  
 306090 06, Shifting Infrastructures  
 306090 07, Landscape Within Architecture  
 306090 08, Autonomous Urbanism  
 306090 09, Regarding Public Space

306090 books
 Decoration: 306090 10, edited by Emily Abruzzo, Alexander Briseno, and Jonathan D. Solomon  
 Models: 306090 11, edited by Emily Abruzzo, Eric Ellingsen, and Jonathan D. Solomon  
 Dimension: 306090 12, edited by Emily Abruzzo, Jonathan D. Solomon  
 Sustain and Develop: 306090 13, edited by Joshua Bolchover, Jonathan D. Solomon  
 Making A Case: 306090 14, edited by Emily Abruzzo, Gerald Bodziak, and Jonathan D. Solomon  
 (Non-) Essential Knowledge for (New) Architecture: 306090 15, edited by David L. Hays  
 Workbook: The Official Catalog for Workshopping: An American Model for Architectural Practice, edited by Emily Abruzzo

References

Architectural theory
Architecture journals